Church Butte is a  butte located in the Lewis Range, Glacier National Park in the U.S. state of Montana.

See also
 Mountains and mountain ranges of Glacier National Park (U.S.)

References

Buttes of Montana
Landforms of Flathead County, Montana
Landforms of Glacier National Park (U.S.)
Lewis Range